Alice Jones (born 16 May 1976 in Timmsvale, New South Wales) is an Australian Olympic alpine skier. She competed in three events at the 2002 Winter Olympics.

References

External links
 
 
 

1976 births
Living people
Australian female alpine skiers
Alpine skiers at the 2002 Winter Olympics
Olympic alpine skiers of Australia
Sportswomen from New South Wales